Douglas Charles Richardson (born April 16, 1951, Sacramento, California) is an American genealogist, historian, lecturer, and author based in Salt Lake City in Utah. He has researched cases involving all periods of American research from colonial to the modern times. He has written extensively on the genealogy of medieval English gentry families and English royalty.

Early life and career
Richardson was born April 16, 1951 in Sacramento, California to Wayne H. Richardson (1917-2003) and his wife Joan Elizabeth nee Kercheval (1917-1991). He took a B.A. degree in History from the University of California Santa Barbara, and a M.A. degree in History from the University of Wisconsin-Madison. As a schoolteacher of American History he held positions at El Reno Junior College, in El Reno, Oklahoma, and at Hillsdale Free Will Baptist College, in Oklahoma City, Oklahoma.

He was Contributing Editor of The American Genealogist and was formerly a member of the Santa Barbara Genealogical Society and of the Connecticut Society of Genealogists.

Publications

Major books

The book seeks to identify all the early American colonists whose ancestry can be traced back to the English monarchs.

Expanded 2011 Edition, Vols. 1, 2, 3 & 4, 2011.

Vols. 1, 2, 3, 4, 5 & 2013. This book lists descents from the early Kings of England, France, and Scotland for over 250 persons who emigrated from the British Isles to the North American colonies in the 17th century. The book includes the above "Magna Carta Ancestry: A Study in Colonial and Medieval Families" and "Plantagenet Ancestry: A Study in Colonial and Medieval Families" plus new information.

Other books

 
 
 
A reprinting of three publications with a fourth part by Douglas Richardson.

Off-print from NEHGR article

Contributed books
 
Lines 16D, 22, 59A, 90A and 101A contributed by Douglas Richardson.

Articles

The New England Historical and Genealogical Register (NEHGR)

The American Genealogist (TAG)

Heritage Quest Magazine (HQM)

The New York Genealogical and Biographical Record (NYGBR)

Foundations

Website
  - Royal Ancestry Publications

Ancestors

References

American genealogists
Living people
1951 births
People from Sacramento, California
University of California, Santa Barbara alumni
University of Wisconsin–Madison College of Letters and Science alumni
Schoolteachers from California
Historians from California